The Communist Party of Indochina (Vietnamese: Đông Dương Cộng sản Đảng 1929–1930) is one of three predecessors of the Communist Party of Vietnam. Other two predecessors are the Communist Party of Annam (An Nam cộng sản Đảng, 1929–1930) and the Communist League of Indochina.

In March 1929, some radical members of the Vietnam Revolutionary Youth League (VARY) including Trần Văn Cung, Nguyễn Đức Cảnh, Trịnh Đình Cửu, Đỗ Ngọc Du, Dương Hạc Đính, Ngô Gia Tự, Kim Tôn formed the first communist cell in French Indochina. This communist cell's mission as itself claimed is to be the core of a future communist party. Trần Văn Cung was voted to be the secretary of the cell. He together with Trịnh Đình Cửu and Kim Tôn were voted to be attendees of the congress of VARY, held in Hong Kong in May 1929. In this congress, these attendees proposed to transform VARY to be a communist party. Their proposal, however, was rejected by the leadership of VARY, Trần Văn Cung, Trịnh Đình Cửu and Kim Tôn then made a walkout from the congress. They were later expelled from the Youth League.

On 17 June 1929, the above communist cell hold a meeting in Hanoi and decided to form the Communist Party of Indochina, declared the party's political fundamental and proclamation, led by Trịnh Đình Cửu, Nguyễn Đức Cảnh, Ngô Gia Tự, Trần Văn Cung,... The party published Búa Liềm (Hammer and Sickle) newspaper. Soon thereafter, the Communist Party of Annam was formed in Cochinchina in August 1929 and the New Revolutionary Party of Vietnam was transformed to be the Communist League of Indochina in January 1930.

In 1930 following appeals for unity by Nguyễn Ái Quốc, the Communist Party of Indochina united with the Communist Party of Annam and the Communist League of Indochina and founded the Communist Party of Vietnam.

References

  Institute of History. History of Vietnam, Volume VIII (the period of 1919–1930). Publisher of Social Science. Hanoi.
  
 Noung. The prehistory of the Vietnamese Communist Party. Everything2.com.
 Smith, R.B., 'The Foundation of the Indochinese Communist Party, 1929–1930', Modern Asian Studies, 32,4 (1998), p. 799.

Defunct political parties in Vietnam
Communist parties in Vietnam
History of the Communist Party of Vietnam
Political parties established in 1929
Political parties disestablished in 1930
1929 establishments in French Indochina
1930 disestablishments in French Indochina
1929 establishments in Vietnam
1930 disestablishments in Vietnam
1920s in French Indochina
1920s in Vietnam